Hanoverville is an unincorporated community in Northampton County, Pennsylvania. It is part of the Lehigh Valley metropolitan area, which had a population of 861,899 and was the 68th most populous metropolitan area in the U.S. as of the 2020 census.

Hanoverville is located on Township Line Road, south of Hanoverville Road, at the tripoint of Bethlehem, Hanover, and Lower Nazareth townships.

References

Unincorporated communities in Northampton County, Pennsylvania
Unincorporated communities in Pennsylvania